Florence Stacpoole (1850 – 2 December 1942) was a writer with a primary focus on health and budgeting.

Biography

Florence Stacpoole was the daughter of Rev. William Church Stacpoole and Charlotte Augusta Mountjoy . She was born in Dublin in 1850. Her father was dean of Kingstown and a doctor of divinity in Trinity College Dublin. Stacpoole had two brothers who were also writers, she had a total of six siblings. William Henry Stacpoole wrote children's books and Henry de Vere Stacpoole wrote novels. Stacpoole moved to Gosport in Hampshire.

She wrote predominantly on women's health and child care. Stacpoole was also a suffragist. Her work was published in journals and magazines as well as in short pamphlets. She was published by the National Health Society where she was a lecturer. Stacpoole was a member of the Obstetrical Society of London and she worked for the councils of technical education as a lecturer. Her work had a progressive attitude and took a commonsense approach. Stacpoole was also a member of the British Astronomical Association, she had an interest in astronomy. She was also religious and part of the Modern Churchman's Union. She died 2 December 1942.

Works
 The care of infants and young children and invalid feeding (1895) 
 Handbook of housekeeping for small incomes (1898)
 Ailments of women and girls (1904)
 A Healthy Home: And how to Keep it (1905)
 Women's health and how to take care of it (1906)

Sources

1850 births
1942 deaths
British women writers
People from Gosport
Writers from Dublin (city)